Paul Donoghue SM (born 18 January 1949) is the sixth Catholic Bishop of Rarotonga (2011–present) in the Cook Islands. He was appointed bishop by Pope Benedict XVI on 11 April 2011.

Early life
Donoghue was born in Te Puke. He received his secondary education at St Patrick's College, Silverstream. After studies at Mount St Mary's Seminary, Greenmeadows and a period as a Marist Brother, he was professed as a member of the Society of Mary on 7 January 1969 and ordained a priest by Bishop John Mackey at Frankton on 29 June 1975.

Career
After ordination, Donoghue taught for some time at St Bede's College, Christchurch, before joining the Marist Oceania province. When he was appointed as Bishop of Rarotonga he was the Provincial Superior of the Oceania province (2006–2011). Prior to being provincial he taught at Chanel College, Moamoa (1977–1981), Samoa, and was Marist novice master at the Marist Training Centre, Tutu, Taveuni Island (1985–1990), Fiji. He was director of the St Martin de Porres Centre, Lololima, Malekula Island, Vanuatu (1993–1996) and regional superior, Vanuatu (1996–1998). He returned to Tutu and was formator of novices there (1998–2000). From 2000 to 2006 he participated in the Marist renewal programme in Ireland.

Episcopacy
Donoghue was consecrated a bishop on 16 July 2011 with his immediate predecessor, Bishop Stuart France O’Connell, S.M as principal consecrator.  The principal co-consecrators were Archbishop Charles Daniel Balvo (Nuncio to the Cook Islands) and Bishop Denis George Browne of Hamilton (also a predecessor in Rarotonga).

References

External links

 Catholic Hierarchy website Bishop Paul Donoghue SM (retrieved 18 April 2011).

 

1949 births
Living people
New Zealand expatriates
20th-century Roman Catholic bishops in New Zealand
New Zealand people of Irish descent
People from Rarotonga
People from Te Puke
Marist Brothers
Roman Catholic bishops in the Cook Islands
New Zealand Roman Catholic bishops
Roman Catholic bishops of Rarotonga